Pétur Björn Jónsson (born 20 October 1971) is an Icelandic former former professional footballer who played as a midfielder.

In 1993, while a member of Leiftur, he led the Icelandic Cup in goals with 10 scored. After several seasons with Leiftur, He joined Hammarby in 1997 and played there to 1999. In November 1999, he joined Knattspyrnufélag Akureyrar.

Personal life
Pétur is the son of former footballer Jón Pétursson who played 26 matches for the Iceland national team.

In 1980, Pétur appeared in the lead role in the Icelandic film Punktur punktur komma strik that was made after the book by Pétur Gunnarsson by the same name.

References

External links

1971 births
Living people
Petur Bjorn Jonsson
Association football midfielders
Allsvenskan players
Petur Bjorn Jonsson
Petur Bjorn Jonsson
Hammarby Fotboll players
Petur Bjorn Jonsson
Petur Bjorn Jonsson
Petur Bjorn Jonsson
Petur Bjorn Jonsson
Expatriate footballers in Sweden
Petur Bjorn Jonsson